Charles Benjamin Norton (July 1, 1825 – 1891) was an American archivist, early American historian and publisher of books, a dealer in rare books and one of the few individuals in his day that made arduous efforts to preserve early American history in the form of published manuscripts, books, diaries, letters, etc. He founded Norton's Literary Letter, a numismatic journal, in 1857. Norton also served as a Lieutenant-Colonel on the staff of General Fitz John Porter during the American Civil War. After the war, he kept abreast of the post-war American inventions and developments of ordnance and munitions and authored and edited several books outlining this advent.

Early life

Norton was born in Hartford, Connecticut, on July 1, 1825. He lived much of his early life in Boston, where he became well known by the literary community. He was the son of the late Major Benjamin Hammatt Norton who was the consul at Pictou under President Zachary Taylor.

Career

Norton as a collector of coins is famous to American numismatists as he founded and published Norton's Literary Letter beginning in October 1857. The publication included numismatic information and inspired interests among New York and New England numismatists for a numismatic publication of their own resulting in the American Journal of Numismatics. In April 1855 he sold his stock of books at John Keese Auction House, New York.

Before 1861 Norton was a dealer in rare books in New York City, and made occasional trips to Europe, buying books from distinguished libraries, and donating or reselling them for public and private use. In 1861 he donated a number of books to the library at Harvard University.

Norton was mostly known for his Literary Gazette, the country's first library periodical. In the Literary Gazette is where the first library convention was held, in September 1853, in New York City, the predecessor to the American Library Association. Beginning in 1857, Norton authored and published a series of historically informative catalogs called Norton's Literary Letter, featuring "Rare and Valuable Works relative to America". i.e. rare books, letters, coins and medals. The publication featured a number of historically related essays.  Norton, Grant and Coit Gilman, from Yale university, were the publication's editors. 
 

Norton also arranged the reunion of 1853 attendees at the 1887 American Library Association at the Thousand Islands.

Norton's stationery and his Literary Letter title page emblem depicts a balance, on which there is a sword on one side, and a quill feather pen on the other, with the quill pen weighing heavier than the sword.

Civil War

During the American Civil War Norton served with distinction in the Union Army as a quartermaster in a New York Regiment, then as a lieutenant colonel in the 5th Army Corps, Army of the Potomac, on the staff of General Fitz John Porter, headquartered at Harrison's Landing on the James River in Virginia. and was present at the Second Battle of Bull Run in Virginia, and at the Battle of Antietam in Maryland in 1862. He was brevetted brigadier-general in 1863, after which he resigned his commission on January 6 of that year.

During the Northern Virginia Campaign, as General Lee and his troops were getting closer to Washington D.C., Norton offered to hide and store the vast archival library of Peter Force, housed in that city, from potential Confederate invaders; however, Force did not want to vacate Washington with his library and declined Norton's offer.

Post war
Shortly after the war, in 1867 during the ongoing series of Expositions in Paris, Norton and his associate William J. Valentine traveled to Paris to examine the exhibit of the latest U.S. military ordnance and munitions on display there. Norton had criticized the U.S. government for not sending their own engineers and military officers to the exposition to examine and investigate all the new weapons and munitions developed during and after the Civil War, and for remaining largely ignorant of these developments and the engineers responsible.  To this end Norton, a Brevet Brigadier General, acting as U.S. Commissioner, and Valentine set, out to conduct their own investigation and in 1868 published their findings in a 286-page report, i.e. Report to the Government of the United States on the Munitions of War Exhibited at the Paris Universal Exhibition, which contains many schematic illustrations and outlines of breech-loading rifles and other weapons. The report was presented to the Secretary of State, William H. Seward. Along with an outline of the various new weapons they examined, the report expressed their desire that it be read by Congress and that ultimately it would be published by the War Department. The information accumulated led to Norton's publication of 1880 outlining American inventions involving breech-loading small arms, heavy ordnance, and other arms.

Final days
Norton was appointed and served as United-States Commissioner to the Paris Exposition in 1867. Norton died in Chicago in 1891 while helping to plan the Columbian Exposition.

Selected works
Norton authored many books covering a wide range of nationally oriented subjects, concerning government, history, conventions and military related topics. Some of his more notable works include:
 Catalogue of a bibliographical library, 1855
 Norton's literary gazette and publishers' circular, 1855
 American inventions and improvements in breech-loading small arms, heavy ordnance, machine guns, magazine arms, fixed ammunition ... 1880
 Report to the Government of the United States on the Munitions of War Exhibited at the Paris Universal Exhibition, 1867
 Norton's Literary Letter: Comprising American Papers of Interest Upon Numismatics and Medals, 1862
 Official Catalogue Foreign Exhibition, Boston, 1883
 The American Exhibition of the Arts, Inventions, Manufacturers, 1885
 The President And His Cabinet: Indicating The Progress Of The Government Of The United States Under The Administration Of Grover Cleveland, 1888

See also
 Peter Force, 19th century archivist
 American Numismatic Society
 John Clement Fitzpatrick - historian and archivist of the Papers of George Washington
 Howard Henry Peckham – prominent early American archivist
 Antiquarian
 Antiquarian Booksellers' Association of America
 List of American Civil War brevet generals (Union)
 James Kendall Hosmer, writer, historian and librarian

Notes

References

Bibliography

 

 
 
 
 
 

  See Google listing also

 

American archivists
1825 births
1891 deaths
Writers from Hartford, Connecticut
People of Connecticut in the American Civil War
Union Army officers